Goran Karačić (born 18 August 1996) is a Bosnian professional footballer who plays as a goalkeeper for Süper Lig club Adana Demirspor.

Club career

Early career
Karačić began his football career at his hometown club Zrinjski Mostar. He made his professional debut on 26 July 2015 against Olimpik. In June 2016, Karačić signed a four-year contract with Turkish club Adanaspor. He debuted for them in a league game against Kasımpaşa. On 31 August 2017, SV Sandhausen signed Karačić on loan until June 2018.

International career
Karačić represented Bosnia and Herzegovina's all youth categories throughout the years.

In May 2016, he received first senior call-up, but an injury suffered in training session, prevented him from taking part in the 2016 Kirin Cup.

Personal life
Goran is the youngest of the Karačić brothers. His older brothers Ivan and Igor are both professional handball players. Ivan is representing Bosnia and Herzegovina, while Igor is playing for Croatia.

Career statistics

Club

Honours
Zrinjski Mostar
Bosnian Premier League: 2015–16

References

External links

1996 births
Living people
Sportspeople from Mostar
Croats of Bosnia and Herzegovina
Bosnia and Herzegovina footballers
Bosnia and Herzegovina expatriate footballers
Expatriate footballers in Turkey
Expatriate footballers in Germany
Bosnia and Herzegovina expatriate sportspeople in Turkey
Bosnia and Herzegovina expatriate sportspeople in Germany
Premier League of Bosnia and Herzegovina players
Süper Lig players
TFF First League players
HŠK Zrinjski Mostar players
Adanaspor footballers
SV Sandhausen players
Bosnia and Herzegovina youth international footballers
Bosnia and Herzegovina under-21 international footballers
Association football goalkeepers